Jabalpur East Assembly constituency is one of the 230 Vidhan Sabha (Legislative Assembly) constituencies of Madhya Pradesh state in central India.

It is part of Jabalpur district.

Members of Legislative Assembly
 2003: Anchal Sonkar, Bharatiya Janata Party
 2008: Lakhan Ghanghoriya, Indian National Congress
 2013: Anchal Sonkar, Bharatiya Janata Party

References

Assembly constituencies of Madhya Pradesh
Jabalpur district